Eupithecia obtinens is a moth in the family Geometridae. It is found in Afghanistan and Iran.

References

Moths described in 1941
obtinens
Moths of Asia